Minworth is a suburban village situated in the civil parish of Sutton Coldfield, West Midlands. It lies within the City of Birmingham on its northeastern outer fringe, where it forms part of the Sutton Walmley and Minworth electoral ward and borders the North Warwickshire district, some 4.5 miles southeast of Sutton Coldfield town centre. 

The village is immediately adjacent to the Sutton suburb of Walmley, the hamlet of Wiggins Hill and the Warwickshire village of Curdworth. The River Tame runs through the south of the area. Minworth has close transport links to the M6, M6 Toll and M42 motorways, while the closest rail station is nearby Water Orton railway station in Water Orton, Warwickshire.

History
Minworth's name probably came from Mynna's Estate. Minworth and Curdworth both originated in the 6th or 7th centuries, being established by Angle settlers, and are historically associated with the Arden family (William Shakespeare's maternal relations). Peddimore Hall is a double-moated farmstead and can be associated with the Ardens from 1298 until 1659. The present farmhouse can be dated to the 16th century. Minworth was originally a hamlet in the parish of Curdworth in the hundred of Hemlingford. Minworth then became a civil parish in the Castle Bromwich Rural District of Warwickshire from 1894 to 1912, then becoming part of the Meriden Rural District. In 1931 the parish was abolished, with the populated parts being split between Sutton Coldfield and Birmingham, and an area of unpopulated land going to Castle Bromwich parish. When excavations were undertaken for Minworth sewage works, evidence of the Pleistocene period was found here, including the fossilised bones of a mammoth which walked this way one million years ago.

The name of the settlement was documented on the Domesday book as Meneworde from the Old English Mynna's worth, 'Mynna's farmstead'. Although Mynna is not found recorded elsewhere as a personal name, it is believed to be such. At this time Minworth was a small and poor manor of only one hide, c50 hectares. There was sufficient land for one ploughteam, but land only equivalent to half a ploughteam was under cultivation worked by a single villein. The manor had 5 acres of meadow presumably along the north bank of the River Tame and a small amount of woodland, half a league long by three furlongs wide. Minworth's entry in the Domesday Book from Open Domesday. See Acknowledgements before the Norman Conquest an Anglo-Saxon, Godric had held the manor from Thorkell, Lord of Warwick, and he continued to hold it thereafter. Norman lords were in control of most of the Birmingham manors by 1086. In the time of King Edward the value for tax purposes was five shillings, a small amount, and this was till the case in 1086.

Minworth Mill on the River Tame ground corn here from at least the 14th century until 1872. By the middle of the 18th century the mill was also taking advantage of Birmingham's successful armaments trade and was engaged in boring gun barrels. All traces of the mill are now gone, obliterated by a late 20th-century industrial estate which stands on the site half a mile west of Water Orton Bridge. However, traces of watercourses are still visible.
Plans to revitalise Minworth in the past have met with a cool reception. A council plan aimed to construct new housing, shops and encourage new industry into the area. However, residents did not back the plan as they wanted Minworth to remain the same. Another plan to develop an 11-acre patch of land into a canal-side marina also met with disapproval from residents, who did not want the Birmingham and Fazeley Canal to become a busy area.

Businesses 
Since the 1980s, the area immediately south and east of residential Minworth has developed as a centre for light industries and the distribution sector, due to its close proximity to the M42 motorway, the M6 motorway and the M6 toll motorway. 

A large Asda Supercentre is situated on the Minworth border with Walmley. This opened on 3 May 1977 as a Carrefour hypermarket, before being taken over by the Dee Corporation that owned Gateway Foodmarkets and the larger Gateway Superstores in 1987. Since late 1989 it has been an Asda hypermarket, which after Asda was taken over by Walmart in 1999 was branded as an Asda Wal*Mart Supercentre in 2001. By 2007, however, the building was becoming outdated and Asda decided to rebuild it, but after haggling with the local authority Asda decided against this due to the costs demanded for environmental incentives and planning conditions deemed to be excessive by the company. The original store still remains there today. However, the interior of the store was completely remodelled and more or less rebuilt. The exterior was also refreshed and from 2008, the store signage was changed to Asda Supercentre and the Walmart branding was removed.

The site has a Wickes DIY store. There is also a B&M Bargains store overlooking the adjacent site and a Screwfix opposite.  Minworth has two pubs: The Hare and Hounds and The Boat, which lie on the Birmingham and Fazeley Canal. Minworth Social Club is on Water Orton Lane offers bed and breakfast accommodation as well as social club facilities. Minworth Convenience is a small local shop on Kingsbury Road and opposite this is Mansells offering MOTs and repair services for motorcycles, bicycles and lawnmowers. Motorcycle training is provided by Spirit Rider on the Kingsbury Road and further motorcycle repair services are provided by Flying on Wings Motorcycle Repair, which is adjacent. Also nearby are: Chili Spice Indian takeaway and Hullternative environmental services.

On Forge Lane and Maybrook Road there are industrial units including: Selecta (vending); steelworks; Cooke & Son (furniture); Speedy (hire); Safestyle UK and Selco (building). At Midpoint Park there are major premises for: The Works (books); Cadbury; Hozelock (hoses), All Metal Services and a paper company. There is also an American Auto Center offering specialist services for US vehicles.

Water treatment works
Minworth STW Severn Trent’s largest sewage treatment plant, serving a population equivalent of 1.75 million. The works treats sludge from a population equivalent of 2.3 million made up of indigenous sludge plus imported sludge from various works in south Staffordshire and North Warwickshire. Minworth is Severn Trent’s largest renewable energy facility with 8MW CHP capacity and Biogas to Grid which produces 30% of their green energy. MWH Treatment was awarded the Minworth THP project in February 2016, after a two stage ECI project. The initial project cost was £37m, with a 35 month programme. Through our early delivery Severn Trent enjoyed increased revenue from exporting gas on 13 June 2018, 4 weeks ahead of schedule, netting them a further £200k.

Education

Minworth Junior and Infant School 
The provision of a school in Minworth came late to the village. A small school for infants was opened in 1897 and a 35 year old village woman, Emma Hughes, was appointed the mistress. All other children had to brave the elements and attend schools in the nearby villages. The infant school was situated at the side of the wheelwright's shop but it soon became overcrowded and inadequate. The board of education threatened to withdraw financial support from the school unless new premises were found, and a permanent village schoolroom became a priority. On 29 December 1900 a new building was opened on the opposite side of the green. This proved to be a great improvement on the accommodation that the children had experienced in the wheelwright's shop, yet Minworth still had no provision for schooling children over the age of 7 years. For these children, school meant walking to one of the nearby villages to continue their education. With the growing success of Emma Hughes' infant department the necessity for a new school to accommodate the older village children became essential.

Public transport
All bus routes serve Sutton Coldfield with the 71 to Chelmsley Wood, X4 to Wylde Green, Erdington and Birmingham and routes 77/77A to Erdington and Walsall.  Diamond Bus service 76 provides occasional links to Kingsbury and Tamworth.

References

External links
 Minworth council
 
 Minworth in BBC Domesday Reloaded

Areas of Birmingham, West Midlands
Sutton Coldfield